The 66th Filipino Academy of Movie Arts and Sciences (FAMAS) Awards was an awarding ceremony given by the Filipino Academy of Movie Arts and Sciences (FAMAS), an organization composed of prize-winning writers and movie columnists, giving recognition to the Philippine mainstream and independent films, actors, actresses, directors and production staffs for their achievements in the year 2017. The awards night is also produced by Ms. Donna B. Sanchez of Megavision Integrated Resources.

For the first time, the nominees of the FAMAS Awards were screened and hand-picked by an independent jury composed of well-known academicians, film practitioners and film critics led by multi-titled screenwriter Ricardo "Ricky" Lee.

The awards night was held at The Theatre at Solaire Resort & Casino, Parañaque on 10 June 2018. It was shown on Cinema One on 30 June 2018 and hosted by Piolo Pascual, Kim Chiu, and Robi Domingo.

The film Balangiga: Howling Wilderness won the majority of the awards including the coveted Best Picture, Best Production Design, Best Cinematography, Best Original Screenplay and Best Original Song awards. Agot Isidro took home the Best Actress award, while Allen Dizon scored the Best Actor award.

Awards

Major Awards
Winners are listed first and highlighted with boldface.

Special Awards

Comedy King Dolphy Memorial Award
 Vice Ganda

FAMAS Lifetime Achievement Award
 Lav Diaz

Fernando Poe, Jr. Award
 Coco Martin

German Moreno Youth Achievement Award
 Awra Briguela and Julie Anne San Jose

Special Citation
 Rosa Rosal

Dr. Jose Perez Memorial Award for Journalism
 Ambet Nabus

Male and Female Celebrity of the Night
 Joshua Garcia and Julia Barretto

Male and Female Face of the Night
 JC Santos and Max Eigenmann

References

External links
FAMAS Awards 

FAMAS Award
FAM
FAM